Ernst Ascan Jencquel (11 January 1879 – 27 December 1939) was a German rower. He competed in the men's eight event at the 1900 Summer Olympics.

References

External links

1879 births
1939 deaths
German male rowers
Olympic rowers of Germany
Rowers at the 1900 Summer Olympics
Rowers from Hamburg